Caymanostellidae is a family of sea stars containing six species in two families. These asteroids normally have thick bodies with large discs.

Taxonomy

List of families according to World Register of Marine Species:
 Belyaevostella Rowe, 1989
 Belyaevostella hispida (Aziz & Jangoux, 1984)
 Belyaevostella hyugaensis Fujita, Stampanato & Jangoux, 1994
 Caymanostella Belyaev, 1974
 Caymanostella admiranda Belyaev & Litvinova, 1977
 Caymanostella madagascariensis Belyaev & Litvinova, 1991
 Caymanostella phorcynis Rowe, 1989
 Caymanostella spinimarginata Belyaev, 1974

References

Velatida
Echinoderm families